Chuuk or Truk may refer to:
 Chuuk State, one of the four states of the Federated States of Micronesia
 Chuuk Lagoon, or Chuuk Atoll, a sheltered body of water and island group in the central Pacific
 Chuuk International Airport, an airport located on Weno, in Chuuk State, Micronesia
 Chuukese language, a language of the Austronesian language family 
 Chuukese people, an ethnic group in Oceania

Language and nationality disambiguation pages